The Hawaii Sports Hall of Fame is a sports hall of fame and museum in the U.S. state of Hawaii. According to the hall's official website, it servers as the "state museum for sports history in the islands," and "is best described as an educational repository created to enshrine athletes, pioneers and contributors of Hawai'i's rich sports history." The organization was founded in 1997 and a selection committee meets once a year in December. The flagship exhibition for the hall is located in the Bishop Museum in Honolulu.

The 2016 class, inducted in May 2016, included water polo player Brandon Brooks, decathlete Bryan Clay, soccer player Brian Ching, and brothers Ma'ake Kemoeatu and Chris Kemoeatu for American football.

Inductees

Auto racing
 Danny Ongais

Baseball
 J. Ashman Beaven
 Alexander Cartwright
 Sid Fernandez
 Hank Hughes
 Mike Lum
 Les Murakami
 Steere Noda
 Lenn Sakata
 Derek Tatsuno
 Shane Victorino
 Tadashi Wakabayashi
 Wally Yonamine

Basketball
 Red Rocha

Boat racing
 Thomas Gentry

Bowling
 Hiroto Hirashima
 Kotaro Miyasato

Boxing
 Takeshi Fuji
 Andrew Ganigan
 Stan Harrington
 Sam Ichinose
 Robert M. Lee
 Dado Marino
 Bobo Olson
 Jesus Salud
 Albert Silva
 Ben Villaflor

Broadcasting
 Les Keiter
 Chuck Leahey

Canoe racing
 A. E. Minvielle
 Joseph Napoleon

Coaching
 Kenneth A. Bray

Decathlon
 Bryan Clay

Diving
 Rachel Kealaonapua O'Sullivan

American football
 Junior Ah You
 Charley Ane
 Herman Clark
 Russ Francis
 Rocky Freitas
 Kurt Gouveia
 Hank Hughes
 Ma'ake Kemoeatu
 Chris Kemoeatu
 Otto Klum
 Olin Kreutz
 Edison Miyawaki
 Jesse Sapolu
 Maa Tanuvasa
 Mosi Tatupu
 Mark Tuinei
 Herman Wedemeyer
 Jeris White
 Wally Yonamine

Golf
 Francis Hyde I`i Brown
 David Ishii
 Tom Kaulukukui
 Ted Makalena
 Jackie Pung
 Lenore Muraoka
 Dean Wilson

Martial arts
 Kevin Asano
 Dae Sung Lee
 Ed Parker

Motorcycle racing
 John DeSoto Jr.

Skeet shooting
 James Austin

Soccer
 Brian Ching
 Natasha Kai
 Jack Sullivan

Sport fishing
 Peter Fithian

Sports promotion
 Donnis Thompson
 Mackay Yanagisawa

Steer roping
 Ikua Purdy

Sumo
 Konishiki Yasokichi
 Takamiyama Daigorō
 Musashimaru Kōyō
 Akebono Tarō

Surfing
 Lynne Boyer
 George Downing
 Sunny Garcia
 Fred Hemmings
 Derek Ho
 Andy Irons
 Duke Kahanamoku
 Richard Keaulana
 Gerry Lopez
 Margo Oberg
 Randy Rarick
 Rell Sunn

Swimming
 Thelma Kalama
 Dad Center
 Dick Cleveland
 Buster Crabbe
 E. Fullard-Leo
 Mariechen Wehselau
 Duke Kahanamoku
 Samuel Kahanamoku
 Maiola Kalili
 Manuella Kalili
 Evelyn Kawamoto
 Pua Kealoha
 Warren Kealoha
 Ford Konno
 Keo Nakama
 Yoshi Oyakawa
 Soichi Sakamoto
 Bill Smith
 Aileen Riggin
 Allen Stack
 Bill Woolsey

Tennis
 Jim Schwitters

Track and field
 Jim Barahal
 Duncan MacDonald
 Jack Scaff
 Norman Tamanaha

Volleyball
 Robyn Ah Mow-Santos
 Lindsey Berg
 Linda Fernandez
 Tom Haine
 Fanny Hopeau
 Sharon Peterson
 Dave Shoji
 Clay Stanley
 Jon Stanley
 Pedro Velasco

Water polo
 Brandon Brooks
 Christopher Duplanty

Weightlifting
 Pete George
 Emerick Ishikawa
 Tommy Kono
 Harold Sakata
 Richard Tom

Wind surfing
 Robby Naish

Women's sports
 Patsy Mink

Wrestling
 Clarissa Chun

Yacht racing
 Clarence W. MacFarlane

References

External links
 Official site
 List of inductees

Halls of fame in Hawaii
State sports halls of fame in the United States
All-sports halls of fame
Museums in Honolulu